Francis John Mugavero (June 8, 1914 – July 12, 1991) was an American Catholic prelate who served as Bishop of Brooklyn from 1968 to 1990.

Early life and ordination
Francis John Mugavero (pronounced Ma-GUV-e-ro) was born on June 8, 1914 in the Bedford-Stuyvesant section of Brooklyn and grew up over his father's barber shop. He studied at Cathedral College in Brooklyn and Immaculate Conception Seminary in Huntington, L.I. and received a master's degree in social work from Fordham.  He was ordained as a parish priest on May 18, 1940, at the age of 25.

In 1965 he was Master of Ceremonies at the Vatican Pavilion of the New York World's Fair in Flushing Meadows during the visit of Pope Paul VI. (Brooklyn and Queens form the diocese of Brooklyn, thus that was the diocese where the World's Fair site was located.)

Bishop
Mugavero had a background in charity work rather than canon law. He headed Brooklyn's office of Catholic Charities before being appointed a bishop. On July 15, 1968, aged 54, he was appointed as the 5th (and first Italian-American) Bishop of Brooklyn, and was consecrated September 12, 1968. His consecrators were Archbishop Luigi Raimondi (Principal Consecrator), Archbishop Terence Cooke and Bishop John Joseph Boardman. Bishop Mugavero was the first bishop of the diocese native to Brooklyn. The Diocese of Brooklyn is separate from the Archdiocese of New York, which encompasses the Bronx, Manhattan, Staten Island, and also Westchester and six other counties north of New York City.

In 1971, Mugavero established the Catholic Migration Office to serve the needs of immigrants and refugees living in Brooklyn and Queens. The first Apostolates were established in 1972 to meet the unique needs of the Italian, Haitian, Polish, Korean, Croatian, and Spanish communities. He often called Brooklyn "the diocese of immigrants," and was proud that Mass was said there in 14 languages.

The Nehemiah concept was formally announced by Bishop Mugavero and the East Brooklyn Churches at a press conference in June, 1982. Named for the biblical prophet who oversaw the reconstruction of the walls of Jerusalem, the plan is to build on the vast acres of vacant land in eastern Brooklyn and offer the homes to buyers with incomes between $20,000 and $40,000. By 1985 the Nehemiah project had produced 300 new row houses in Brownsville at an average cost of $51,000 and sold them to families with incomes averaging less than $25,000.

In 1986 Bishop Mugavero issued a declaration concerning the Bayside Movement,  Our Lady of the Roses, in which he stated, "I, the undersigned Diocesan Bishop of Brooklyn, in my role as the legitimate shepherd of this particular Church, wish to confirm the constant position of the Diocese of Brooklyn that a thorough investigation revealed that the alleged "visions of Bayside" completely lacked authenticity".

In 1987, Bishop Mugavero, established the Immaculate Conception Center at the site of the former Cathedral College. In addition to the Bishops Mugavero/Mulrooney Residences for priests and Cathedral Seminary Residence of the Immaculate Conception, the pastoral center serves as a retreat and conference center. It is home to the Diocesan Tribunal, Pastoral Institute, Institutional Services, Inc., and the Queens office of The Tablet.  It also houses the Offices of Pastoral Planning, Family Life, Hispanic Ministry, Black Ministry, Respect Life and the Office of the Regional Bishop of Queens North as well as other agencies of the Diocese.

He was a founder of the Campaign for Human Development, an annual fund-raising drive for the poor.

Retirement and death
On February 20, 1990, aged 75, he retired as Bishop of Brooklyn with his last public mass at Our Lady of Refuge Church in Brooklyn. He was a priest for 51 years and a bishop for almost 23 years by the time of his death from heart failure at 77, on July 12, 1991, the feast of St. Veronica, while vacationing in East Hampton, New York. He died with the title "bishop emeritus".

Legacy
According to The New York Times, he left a proud legacy, more compassionate and charitable than political.

The Bishop Francis J. Mugavero Center for Geriatric Care at 155 Dean Street, site of the former Holy Family Hospital, was built in Brooklyn in 1993, after his death.

The New York State Catholic Conference Council of Catholic Charities Directors has created the Bishop Mugavero Award which recognizes an individual who, in the spirit of late Bishop Francis Mugavero, has made a significant and sustained contribution to the work of charity and social justice on a statewide level.

Views

Abortion
Bishop Mugavero issued more than 20 pastoral letters strongly condemning abortion. He tended, however, to avoid public criticism of Catholic politicians who supported a right to abortion. He chose to meet such officeholders privately instead.

Sexuality
In February 1976 Bishop Mugavero issued a pastoral letter, "Sexuality - God's Gift", defending the legitimate rights of all people, including homosexuals. He said that homosexuals had been "subject to misunderstanding and at times unjust discrimination". He also said, On a more personal level, we wish to express our concern and compassion for those men and women who experience pain and confusion due to a true homosexual orientation. We pray that through all the spiritual and pastoral means available they will recognize Christ's and the Church's love for them and our hope that they will come to live in His peace.

References

External links
 Diocese of Brooklyn website 
 NY Times obituary
 Mugavero, Bishop Francis J. "Sexuality - God's Gift". February, 11, 1976
 "Bishop Mugavero – This Weekend Marks 100th Anniversary of His Birth", The Tablet

1914 births
1991 deaths
20th-century Roman Catholic bishops in the United States
American people of Italian descent
People from East Hampton (town), New York
Roman Catholic bishops of Brooklyn
Religious leaders from New York (state)
People from Bedford–Stuyvesant, Brooklyn